Brigadier Lyndon Bolton DSO & Bar DL (15 May 1899 – 7 April 1995) was a British Olympic horseman.

Biography
Born in Brentford, Middlesex on 25 May 1899, Lyndon Bolton was educated at Bedford School, between 1906 and 1917, and at the Royal Military Academy, Woolwich.  He served in the British Army during the First World War, in 1918, and became a member of the British equestrian team in the 1930s.  He served in France and North Africa with the Royal Horse Artillery during the Second World War, and was promoted to the rank of Brigadier in the 15th Scottish Division. He rode for Great Britain in the 1948 Summer Olympics, and finished 27th in the three-day event. He subsequently trained the Ireland Olympic equestrian team for the 1964 Summer Olympics.

Brigadier Lyndon Bolton was invested as a Companion of the Distinguished Service Order in 1941, and again in 1945 He died in Alnwick, Northumberland on 4 April 1995, at the age of 95.

Publications

Thoughts on Riding, 1955, Training the Horse, 1964

References

1899 births
1995 deaths
British male equestrians
People educated at Bedford School
Graduates of the Royal Military Academy, Woolwich
Olympic equestrians of Great Britain
Equestrians at the 1948 Summer Olympics
Companions of the Distinguished Service Order
British Army personnel of World War I
British Army personnel of World War II
Deputy Lieutenants of Angus